Carbazole is an aromatic heterocyclic organic compound. It has a tricyclic structure, consisting of two six-membered benzene rings fused on either side of a five-membered nitrogen-containing ring. The compound's structure is based on the indole structure, but in which a second benzene ring is fused onto the five-membered ring at the 2–3 position of indole (equivalent to the 9a–4a double bond in carbazole, respectively).

Carbazole is a constituent of tobacco smoke.

Synthesis

A classic laboratory organic synthesis for carbazole is the Borsche–Drechsel cyclization.

In the first step, phenylhydrazine is condensed with cyclohexanone to the corresponding imine. The second step is a hydrochloric acid-catalyzed rearrangement reaction and ring-closing reaction to tetrahydrocarbazole. In one modification, both steps are rolled into one by carrying out the reaction in acetic acid. In the third step, this compound is oxidized by red lead to carbazole itself. 

Another classic is the Bucherer carbazole synthesis, which uses a naphthol and an aryl hydrazine.

A third method for the synthesis of carbazole is the Graebe–Ullmann reaction. 

In the first step, an N-phenyl-1,2-diaminobenzene (N-phenyl-o-phenylenediamine) is converted into a diazonium salt which instantaneously forms a 1,2,3-triazole. The triazole is unstable and at elevated temperatures, nitrogen is released and the carbazole is formed.

Applications
Aminoethylcarbazole is used in the production of pigment violet 23.

Rimcazole is also made from carbazole proper.
Carprofen is another use.

Related aromatic compounds
Indoline
Indole
Carboline
Fluorene
Pyrrole
N-Vinylcarbazole

References

External links

 MSDS

Carbazoles
IARC Group 2B carcinogens